Floyd Weston Simmons (February 19, 1925 – August 6, 1996) was an American football running back who played one season with the Chicago Rockets of the All-America Football Conference. He was drafted by the Pittsburgh Steelers in the 24th round of the 1948 NFL Draft. He played college football at the University of Notre Dame and attended Jefferson High School in Portland, Oregon.

References

External links
Just Sports Stats
College stats

1925 births
1996 deaths
Players of American football from Portland, Oregon
American football running backs
Jefferson High School (Portland, Oregon) alumni
Notre Dame Fighting Irish football players
Chicago Rockets players